Charles William Sydney Pierrepont, 4th Earl Manvers, VD (2 August 1854 – 17 July 1926), known as Viscount Newark from 1860 to 1900, was a British nobleman and Conservative Party politician.

Career 
Born in London, he was the eldest son of Sydney William Herbert Pierrepont, 3rd Earl Manvers. He was educated at Eton, and was styled by the courtesy title of Viscount Newark from 1860 until succeeded to his father's peerage in January 1900.

Newark was a sub-lieutenant in the Grenadier Guards from 1872 until retiring in 1880, and subsequently held a variety of positions in the Yeomanry and Volunteers: captain in the South Nottinghamshire Yeomanry Cavalry; major in the 2nd Volunteer Battalion (later 8th Bn), Sherwood Foresters) and honorary colonel from 1904; Brigadier-General commanding the North Midland Brigade 1896–1908. In November 1901 he received the Volunteer Officers' Decoration (VD) for his contribution to the North Midlands Infantry Volunteers.

He was elected at the 1885 general election as the Member of Parliament (MP) for the Newark division of Nottinghamshire. He was re-elected unopposed in 1886 and 1892, and stood down at the 1895 general election. However, his Conservative successor Harold Heneage Finch-Hatton resigned in 1898, and Viscount Newark was returned unopposed at the resulting by-election. He held the seat until his succession to the peerage in 1900.

The 4th Earl was a keen sportsman and was Master of the Rufford Hunt from 1900.

Family and children
In 1880 he married Helen Shaw-Stewart, daughter of Sir Michael Shaw-Stewart, 7th Baronet, and had four children:

 Lady Cicely Mary Pierrepont (1886–1936), married Francis Henry Hardy of Edith Weston Hall, Rutland, in 1915
 Evelyn Robert Pierrepont, 5th Earl Manvers (1888–1940)
 Lady Alice Helen Pierrepont (30 August 1889 – 8 March 1969), buried at Ystrad Mynach
 Lady Sibell Pierrepont (1892–1968), married Hubert Davys Argles in 1923

He died suddenly on 17 July 1926 at his house in Tilney Street, London, at the age of 71.

References

Sources

External links 
 

Manvers, Charles William Sydney Pierrepont, 4th Earl
Manvers, Charles William Sydney Pierrepont, 4th Earl
Earls in the Peerage of the United Kingdom
Conservative Party (UK) MPs for English constituencies
People educated at Eton College
UK MPs 1885–1886
UK MPs 1886–1892
UK MPs 1892–1895
UK MPs 1895–1900
Manvers, E4
Manvers, Charles William Sydney Pierrepont, 4th Earl
Manvers, Charles William Sydney Pierrepont, 4th Earl
South Nottinghamshire Hussars officers
Charles